Italy  competed at the 2022 World Aquatics Championships in Budapest, Hungary from 18 June to 3 July. Having clinched the final in men's water polo, for the first time it has won at least one medal in every discipline.

Medalists

Artistic swimming 

Italy entered 14 artistic swimmers.

Women

Mixed

Diving 

Men

Women

Mixed

Open water swimming 

 Men

 Women

 Mixed

Swimming

Italy ranked third in the medal table of swimming behind the USA and China, with 9 gold, 6 silver and 6 bronze medals won.

Italy entered 29 swimmers.
Men

Women

Mixed

 Legend: (*) = Swimmers who participated in the heat only.

Water polo 

Summary

Men's tournament

Team roster

Group play

Playoffs

Quarterfinal

Semifinals

Final

Women's tournament

Team roster

Group A

Quarterfinals

Semifinals

Third place game

See also
 Italy national swimming team
 Italy men's national water polo team
 Italy women's national water polo team

Notes

References

World Aquatics Championships
2022
Nations at the 2022 World Aquatics Championships